HMS Challenger was a survey ship of the United Kingdom's Royal Navy. She was laid down in 1930 at Chatham Dockyard and built in a dry dock. Afterwards she was moved to Portsmouth for completion and commissioned on 15 March 1932.

Service history
Until the outbreak of the Second World War, Challenger surveyed the waters around the United Kingdom, Labrador, the West Indies, and the East Indies. She was later refloated.

From 1939 to 1942 she served in home waters and as a convoy escort. In June and July 1941 she and three s escorted the troop ship  from Britain en route for Freetown, Sierra Leone. When the troop ship was torpedoed north of the Azores, Challenger and the corvette HMS Starwort rescued hundreds of survivors and then transferred them to the armed merchant cruiser HMS Cathay.

From 1942 to 1946 Challenger surveyed in the Indian Ocean and the Western Pacific. She returned to Chatham in 1946 for a refit before returning to the Persian Gulf in late 1946. She left the Gulf in 1947 and went to Cyprus where a shore party logged tides. She then proceeded to Gibraltar for another refit in dry dock.

She circumnavigated the world from 1950 to 1953, surveying in the West Indies and the Far East, under Senior Scientist Dr. Thomas F. Gaskell. This point was named Challenger Deep, a nearby survey having been conducted in 1875 during an expedition by a previous . 

In January 1954, Challenger returned to Britain, was paid off, and was broken up at Dover.

References

Sources
 
 

 

 

Survey vessels of the Royal Navy
1931 ships
Ships built in Chatham
Maritime incidents in 1932